Lydia Ludic Burundi Académic Football Club or simply LLB Académic FC is a football (soccer) club from Burundi based in Bujumbura. Their home venue is 10,000 capacity Prince Louis Rwagasore Stadium.

Honours
Burundi Premier League
Winners (1): 2013–14
Runners-up (1): 2010–11

Burundian Cup
Winners (3): 2011, 2012, 2014

Burundi Super Cup
Winners (1): 2012

Performance in CAF competitions
CAF Confederation Cup: 2 appearances
2012 – First Round
2013 –
Preliminary round :
LLB Académic –  Police : 1–0
 Police – LLB Académic : 1–1
First round :
 Motema Pembe – LLB Académic : 1–0
LLB Académic –  Motema Pembe : 2–0
Second round :
 ASEC Mimosas – LLB Académic : 1–0
LLB Académic –  ASEC Mimosas : 1–0 (4–2 pens) 
Play-off round :
 Stade Malien – LLB Académic: 5–0
LLB Académic – Stade Malien: 0–1

CAF Champions League: 1 appearance
2015 – Preliminary Round

External links
Official website

Football clubs in Burundi
Bujumbura